The 12651 / 12652 Tamil Nadu Sampark Kranti Express is one of the Sampark Kranti Express trains, operating on India's broad-gauge network that connects  in Tamil Nadu and  in New Delhi, a distance of approximately  in 42 hours approximately, maintaining an average speed of . It shares its rakes with 22623/22624 Chennai Egmore–Madurai Junction–Chennai Egmore Bi-weekly Superfast Express (via Dindigul, Trichy, Thanjavur, Viluppuram). From April 2021, it runs with newly manufactured highly refurbished LHB rakes.

Overview 
This bi-weekly train was introduced to provide a quicker journey from New Delhi to Tamil Nadu. Southern Railway began operating the train on 19 September 2004. The train links the southern part of Tamil Nadu with the national capital along with Thirukural Express.

Coach composition

 1 AC Two Tier
 2 AC Three Tier
 8 Sleeper class
 4 Unreserved
 1 Pantry car
 2 End-on Generator car (EOG)

Route & Halts

Traction
This route is fully electrified and it is hauled by a Royapuram-based WAP-7 locomotive from end to end.

References

Transport in Madurai
Transport in Delhi
Sampark Kranti Express trains
Rail transport in Tamil Nadu
Rail transport in Madhya Pradesh
Rail transport in Uttar Pradesh
Rail transport in Andhra Pradesh
Rail transport in Maharashtra
Rail transport in Delhi
Railway services introduced in 2004